Crystal Castles was a Canadian electronic music group.

Crystal Castles may also refer to:
 Crystal Castles (video game), a 1983 arcade game
 Crystal Castles (album), a 2008 album by the group
 Crystal Castles II, a 2010 album by the group
 Crystal Castle, a fictional castle in She-Ra: Princess of Power

See also 
 Crystal Palace (disambiguation)